Sea Rover may refer to:

, a British Royal Navy submarine commissioned in 1943 and sold in 1949
, originally SP-1014, a United States Navy tugboat in commission from 1918 to 1921

Ship names